Isidingo was a South African soap opera, with dialogue mostly in English and isiXhosa. The series premiered on SABC 3 in July 1998 and was broadcast evenings on SABC 3 from Monday to Friday at 19:00. Until 2001 it was titled Isidingo: The Need.<ref name="Willoughby 2006">{{cite web|url=http://www.tonight.co.za/?fArticleId=3221917&fSectionId=368&fSetId=204|archive-url=https://web.archive.org/web/20081020171758/http://www.tonight.co.za/?fArticleId=3221917&fSectionId=368&fSetId=204 |title=Isidingo'''s lustre will never fade while Barker remains his nasty self |work= tonight.co.za |date=28 April 2006 |access-date=6 December 2014 |archive-date=20 October 2008 |first=Guy |last=Willoughby |publisher=Independent News & Media }}</ref>

Created by Gray Hofmeyr, the story is loosely based on another popular soap opera created by Hofmeyr, The Villagers, that was broadcast during the apartheid era in South Africa.
Former series Head Writers include Neil McCarthy, Mitzi Booysen, Ilse van Hermert, Christian Blomkamp, Busisiwe Ntintili, Loyiso Maqoma, Liam J Stratton, Rosalind Butler, Rohan Dickson, Bongi Ndaba, and Duduzile Zamantungwa Mabaso.

On 29 November 2019 the SABC announced that the production had been cancelled, with the final broadcast being aired on 12 March 2020.

Premise

The main characters include the Haines family, the Matabanes, Vusi Moletsane the mine manager and the various residents of the boarding house owned by Maggie Webster. Barker Haines, owner of ON TV, is a high-living billionaire who often schemes his way into the lives of various people in and out of the mining town Horizon Deep, notably his daughter Leone. The Matabanes are a close-knit family who comprise a stronghold, of sorts, in the populace of Horizon Deep, with Zebedee as the patriarch. Other central characters are Lolly De Klerk, Frank Xavier, Parsons Matibane, Georgie Zamdela and Calvin Xavier.

List of characters

Notable former characters

Major character exits
Actress Michelle Botes, who had played villainess Cherel De Villiers since Isidingo's 1998 debut, announced her imminent departure from the series in October 2006, a week after being "snubbed" by The South African Television Awards (though Isidingo had taken home the most awards). Botes next portrayed Ingrid in the rival soap Binnelanders, which directly competed with Isidingo on the pay-channel M-Net. She returned to  Isidingo from 2010 to 2013.

Soon after winning the Best Actress Award at the South African Film and Television Awards for her portrayal of Leone "Lee" Haines, 32-year-old actress Ashley Callie died following a car accident in February 2008. The role was not recast, and the character was written out by having Lee gone missing as she didn't show up for work, and later revealed she had died in a deserted field without specifying her cause of death.

Six months after Callie's death, the series killed off original character Letti Matabane (played by actress Lesego Motsepe) in a similar car accident, prompting a "nationwide outpouring of grief".

LegacyIsidingo was the first South African TV show to feature a gay kiss, which saw the characters Steve and Len kiss. It also made history when it screened the first gay wedding on South African television when the characters Steve and Luke wed. This episode was broadcast just days after same-sex marriage was legalised in South Africa in 2006. The show's executive producer Pumla Hopa explained how Isidingo'' was different from other soapies at the time: "The thing that sets us apart is that we deal with issues in society from homosexuality, xenophobia, mixed marriages and HIV-Aids. We introduced a different style of storytelling".

See also 
 List of South African television series

References

External links
 
 
 TVSA's Isidingo site
Isidingo on Demand Africa

1998 South African television series debuts
2020 South African television series endings
1990s South African television series
2000s South African television series
2010s South African television series
2020s South African television series
SABC 3 original programming
South African television soap operas